The cohort Polyneoptera is a proposed taxonomic ranking for the Orthoptera (grasshoppers, crickets, etc.) and all other Neopteran insects believed to be more closely related to Orthoptera than to any other insect orders. These winged insects, now in the Paraneoptera, were formerly grouped as the Hemimetabola or Exopterygota on the grounds that they have no metamorphosis, the wings gradually developing externally throughout the nymphal stages.

Taxonomy 
The Polyneoptera Species File lists the following:

Superorder Dermapterida 
 †Protelytroptera

Superorder Dictyoptera 
 Blattodea – cockroaches and termites
 Mantodea – praying mantises

Superorder Orthopterida 
Synonyms include: Archaeorthoptera, Gryllidea, Orthopterodea, Orthopterodida, Orthopteroidea, Panorthoptera
 †Caloneurodea
 †Geraroptera
 Orthoptera – 2 extant suborders:
 Caelifera – grasshoppers, groundhoppers, pygmy mole-crickets
 Ensifera – crickets, mole-crickets, katydids or bush crickets, camel crickets, wetas, etc.
 †Titanoptera – Carboniferous to Triassic
 order Incertae sedis
 family †Cacurgidae Handlirsch, 1911
 family †Chresmodidae Haase, 1890
 family †Permostridulidae Béthoux, Nel, Lapeyrie & Gand, 2003
 family †Protophasmatidae Brongniart, 1885
 genus †Chenxiella Liu, Ren & Prokop, 2009
 genus †Lobeatta Béthoux, 2005
 genus †Nectoptilus Béthoux, 2005
 genus †Sinopteron Prokop & Ren, 2007

Superorder Perlidea (synonym Plecopteroidea) 
 †Cnemidolestida
 Dermaptera – earwigs
 Embioptera – web-spinners
 †Eoblattida
 Plecoptera – stone-flies
 †"Grylloblattida"
 †Geinitziidae
 †Juraperlidae
 †Bajanzhargalanidae
 Notoptera – redefined in 2006 to include Grylloblattidae (ice-crawlers) and Mantophasmatidae (gladiators)
 †Protorthoptera

Stem-Phasmatodea 
 †family Xiphopteridae Sharov 1968
 †family Prochresmodidae Vishnyakova 1980
 †family Aeroplanidae Tillyard 1918
 † family Cretophasmatidae Sharov 1968
 † family Aerophasmatidae Martynov, 1928
 Phasmatodea – stick and leaf insects

Superorder not placed 
 Zoraptera – angel insects
 † family Magicivenidae

Phylogeny 

Song et al 2016 propose a molecular phylogeny for the Polyneoptera, as shown in the phylogenetic tree:

See also
Longzhua

References

External links

 
Insects by classification
Neoptera